The 305th Air Division is an inactive United States Air Force organization. Its last assignment was with Continental Air Command, assigned to Fourth Air Force at McChord Air Force Base, Washington, where it was inactivated on 27 June 1949.

The division was first activated in December 1943 as the 305th Bombardment Wing, although it was used to man other organizations and had no combat units assigned until a month after VE Day when it absorbed the assets of a provisional fighter wing, and the units of another fighter wing, but no bombardment units.  When the surrender of Japan occurred, the unit no longer anticipated a transfer to the Pacific and was inactivated in September 1945.  It was activated in the reserves in 1947.

History

World War II
The division was first activated at Foggia, Italy in late December 1943 as the 305th Bombardment Wing, but does not appear to have been manned until early January. The wing had no combat components assigned until after VE Day in May 1945, and the wing commanding officer was a lieutenant colonel. Instead, its personnel was used to man Fifteenth Air Force headquarters, and a provisional fighter wing which was formed in the fall of 1944.

305th Fighter Wing (Provisional)
Unlike most combat air forces during World War II, Fifteenth Air Force was not assigned a fighter command.  Instead, all its fighter groups were assigned to its bombardment wings until February 1944, when they were transferred to the 306th Bombardment Wing, which became the 306th Fighter Wing in May. On 3 September 1944, Fifteenth formed XV Fighter Command (Provisional) and attached the 306th Wing to it.  At the same time, it also organized the 305th Fighter Wing (Provisional) at Salsola Airfield and attached the three groups of the 306th Wing that were flying Lockheed P-38 Lightnings (the 1st, 14th and 82d Fighter Groups) to the provisional wing.  The 306th Wing retained control of the groups flying the Mustang.

The wing initially focused on strategic missions, such as escorting bombers. After March 1945, the wing moved to Lesina Airfield and its groups focused on interdiction missions against German forces in Italy, Southern Germany, Austria and Yugoslavia.

On 12 June 1945, the provisional wing moved from Lesina to Torremaggiore Airfield, where the 305th Bombardment Wing was already located.  It was disbanded upon arrival and its personnel assigned to the bombardment wing.

Assignment of fighter groups
In addition to absorbing the personnel and headquarters of the provisional wing, the Mustang groups of the 306th Fighter Wing were also assigned to the 305th in June 1945, and the wing instituted an extensive training program in anticipation that its groups would be transferred to the Pacific to participate in the war against Japan.  The 305th emphasized instrument flying and navigation; and formation, high altitude, and transition flying. One of the wing's P-51 groups also conducted experimental work in dive bombing.  Pilots practiced in the Link Trainer and attended classes in engineering, air discipline, intelligence, personal equipment, air sea rescue, chemical warfare and communications procedures.  However, with the surrender of Japan in August the wing began to transfer its groups to the United States at the end of August and was inactivated in Italy in September.

Air Force reserve
The wing was reactivated as a reserve unit under Air Defense Command (ADC) on 12 July 1947 at McChord Field, Washington.  It was assigned the 445th and 456th Bombardment Groups. which were activated the same day at McChord In October, the 454th Bombardment Group was activated at McChord and assigned to the wing. The three groups were all designated as very heavy units, and nominally were Boeing B-29 Superfortress units.  However, there is no indication that the groups were equipped with tactical aircraft. Regular Air Force support for reserve training at McChord was provided by the 2345th Air Force Reserve Training Center.

In 1948, Continental Air Command assumed responsibility from ADC for managing Air National Guard and reserve units. When the regular Air Force implemented the wing base organization system, which placed operational and support units on a base under a single wing that same year, the 305th Wing, along with other reserve wings with more than one combat group assigned, was redesignated as an air division.

The 305th participated in routine reserve training and supervised the training of its three assigned groups until all were inactivated, in part due to President Truman’s 1949 defense budget, which required reductions in the number of units in the Air Force, Most of their equipment and personnel were used to form the 302d Troop Carrier Wing, which was simultaneously activated at McChord.

Lineage
 Established as the 305th Bombardment Wing (Heavy) on 7 December 1943
 Activated on 29 December 1943
 Redesignated 305th Bombardment Wing, Heavy c. 4 May 1945
 Inactivated on 9 September 1945
 Redesignated 305th Bombardment Wing, Very Heavy on 13 May 1947
 Activated in the Reserve on 12 July 1947
 Redesignated 305th Air Division, Bombardment on 16 April 1948
 Inactivated on 27 June 1949

Assignments
 Fifteenth Air Force, 29 December 1943 – 9 September 1945
 Fourth Air Force, 12 July 1947 – 27 June 1949

Stations
 Foggia, Italy, 29 December 1943
 Spinazzola Airfield, Italy, 19 January 1944
 Bari, Italy, 6 March 1944
 Torremaggiore Airfield, Italy, c. December 1944 – 9 September 1945
 McChord Field (later McChord Air Force Base), Washington, 12 July 1947 – 29 June 1949

Components
 Fighter Groups (1945)

 1st Fighter Group: c. 13 June – c. 9 September 1945
 Lesina Airfield, Italy
 14th Fighter Group: c. 13 June – 9 September 1945
 Triolo Airfield, Italy to September 1945, Lesina Airfield, Italy
 31st Fighter Group: c. 13 June – 9 September 1945
 Mondolfo Airfield, Italy to 15 July 1945, Triolo Airfield, Italy to August 1945
 52d Fighter Group: 13 June – c. 30 August 1945
 Piagiolino Airfield, Italy to 8 July 1945, Lesina Airfield, Italy to 10 August 1945
 82d Fighter Group: 3 – 9 September 1945
 Vincenzo Airfield, Italy to x. 30 August 1945, Lesina Airfield, Italy
 325th Fighter Group: 13 June – c. 30 August 1945
 Mondolfo Airfield, Italy to July 1945, Vincenzo Airfield, Italy
 332d Fighter Group: 13 June – c. 9 September 1945
 Cattolica Airfield, Italy to c. 18 July 1945, Lucera Airfield, Italy

 Bombardment Groups (1947–1948)
 445th Bombardment Group: 12 July 1947 – 27 June 1949
 454th Bombardment Group: 17 October 1947 – 27 June 1949
 456th Bombardment Group: 12 July 1947 – 27 June 1949

Aircraft
 Lockheed P-38 Lightning, 1945
 North American P-51 Mustang, 1945

Campaigns

See also
 List of United States Air Force air divisions
 List of Lockheed P-38 Lightning operators

References

Notes

Citations

Bibliography

 
 
 
 
 

Air divisions of the United States Air Force
Military units and formations of the United States Air Force Reserves
European theatre of World War II
Fighter units and formations of the United States Army Air Forces